Diane Jean Lucas  (born 1950) is a New Zealand landscape architect and environmental planner known for her conservation works, and particularly in and around Christchurch, Banks Peninsula and the Canterbury Plains and South Island High Country. She is a strong advocate for the protection of natural and indigenous ecosystems, and sustainable rural management.

Biography 
Lucas grew up on Bendigo Station in the Otago high country, and learnt about conservation early from both her parents and the rugged landscape. In 1971, she achieved a Bachelor of Science in botany at University of Otago and went on to complete a postgraduate diploma in landscape architecture at Lincoln College.

She initially worked for the Ministry of Works and Development, but resigned during the Robert Muldoon era saying she could not work under a government whose policies adversely affected New Zealand’s biodiversity and natural rural landscapes. She set up a practice in Geraldine advising rural landowners on sustainable management, and is the director of Lucas Associates Limited, now based in Christchurch. For decades, her projects and publications have informed and improved urban design, native plantings, waterway restoration, Resource Management Act (RMA) planning, forestry and high country management.

Her many professional and voluntary roles include time with the Natural Heritage Fund, the Department of Conservation, the New Zealand Conservation Authority, the New Zealand Environmental Council,  Ngā Whenua Rāhui (a fund that assists Māori Land owners with protection of indigenous ecosystems), the New Zealand Institute of Landscape Architects (NZILA), Federated Farmers, the New Zealand Farm Forestry Association, and the Christchurch City Council Urban Design Panel. She has also served as president of NZILA, a commissioner at RMA hearings, and judge for the Canterbury Heritage Awards.

From 1995 to 1997, she researched native plant species suitable for home gardeners to grow in their neighbourhood. Together with the Christchurch-Otautahi Agenda 21 committee, she published her research in a set of four booklets on several different areas, entitled Indigenous Ecosystems of Otautahi Christchurch. The booklets include a street map of Christchurch overlaid on a map of the Canterbury Plains ecosystems and soil types. The ecosystems range from old wetlands to forest, through to younger tussock grasslands. In addition, the booklets provide a guide for nurseries and the public about which native trees, shrubs, climbers and groundcovers naturally belong in different areas.

At the time of the Christchurch earthquakes, she warned that old streams have 'memories'. A map of the city drawn up in 1850 showed a number of old waterways that had since been filled in with gravel and built on. Many badly earthquake damaged buildings were sited on top of these old streams.

Honours and awards 

 New Zealand Suffrage Centennial Medal 1993
 New Zealand 1990 Commemoration Medal
 NZILA Charlie Challenger Award, 1996 and 2000 (Lucas Associates team)
 NZILA landscape planning Gold Award, 1998 and 2008 (Lucas Associates team)
 48-Hour Design Challenge, 2011 (as part of the supreme-award-winning team member)
 Resene Total Colour Lifetime Achievement Award, 2012 for her list of sympathetic colours to paint heritage buildings
 John Taylor Award for Leadership in Horticulture, 2017
 Officer of the New Zealand Order of Merit in the 2019 New Year Honours, for services to conservation

Publications 
 Storyscapes: Regeneration of the Port and Banks Peninsula Hills, 2010 (contributor) 
 Indigenous Ecosystems of Otautahi Christchurch
 Set 1, The Plains of Riccarton-Wigram & Spreydon-Heathcote, 1995
 Set 2, The Coastal Plains of Hagley-Ferrymead & Burwood-Pegasus, 1996
 Set 3, The Plains of Shirley-Papanui & Fendalton-Waimairi, 1996
 Set 4, The Port Hills of Christchurch City, 1997
 The Merivale Plan: Developed Through A Community Planning Workshop, 1996
 The Shape of Christchurch Within the Frame of the 4 Avenues: A Plan Developed Through the Inner City Charrette, 1995
 Woodlots in the Landscape, 1987
 Landscape Guidelines for Rural South Canterbury, 1981

References 

1950 births
Living people
People from Otago
University of Otago alumni
Lincoln University (New Zealand) alumni
New Zealand landscape architects
Women landscape architects
New Zealand conservationists
New Zealand public servants
21st-century New Zealand women
Recipients of the New Zealand Suffrage Centennial Medal 1993
Officers of the New Zealand Order of Merit